Berny Elisio Wright McClean (born June 8, 1979) is a Costa Rican former professional footballer.

Club career
He had a stint in the Russian Premier League with Krylia Sovetov in 2003, but left the club in April 2004 claiming they owed him salary. On 29 August 2004, Wright scored Brujas' first Primera Division goal against Herediano.

Personal life
Wright is a brother of former Costa Rican international Mauricio Wright.

Honours
 Russian Cup finalist: 2004 (played in the early stages of the 2003/04 tournament for FC Krylia Sovetov Samara).

References

1979 births
Footballers from San José, Costa Rica
Living people
Association football defenders
Costa Rican footballers
Russian Premier League players
Deportivo Saprissa players
A.D. Carmelita footballers
Comunicaciones F.C. players
PFC Krylia Sovetov Samara players
Costa Rican expatriate footballers
Expatriate footballers in Guatemala
Expatriate footballers in Russia
Costa Rican expatriate sportspeople in Guatemala
Costa Rican expatriate sportspeople in Russia